The Eventfinda Stadium (originally known as the North Shore Events Centre) is an indoor arena located in the North Shore City suburb of Wairau Valley, Auckland, New Zealand. The arena opened in 1992 and has a capacity of 4,179.

It primarily hosts community events and was previously the home arena of the New Zealand Breakers, who play in the Australian NBL. It also hosts concerts, expos, trade shows, conferences, netball, MMA, cheerleading and dance.  It has also hosted the New Zealand Badminton Open for over 10 years.

In 2009, the arena hosted the final of the FIBA Under-19 World Championship. The final saw the United States defeat Greece 88–80.

Boxing
It has hosted a number of boxing events, the majority of them promoted by Shane Cameron. The most famous fight night was in November 2014 where Kali Meehan fought Shane Cameron for the WBA Pan African Heavyweight Title. Also on the card was the Super 8 Cruiserweight tournament. The event was promoted by John Mcrae and New Zealand Sky Arena, as well as being live on Pay Per View with Sky Arena in New Zealand and Australia Main event.

References

Defunct National Basketball League (Australia) venues
1992 establishments in New Zealand
Basketball venues in New Zealand
Netball venues in New Zealand
Boxing venues in New Zealand
Indoor arenas in New Zealand
Sports venues in Auckland
North Shore, New Zealand
Badminton venues
Badminton in New Zealand
New Zealand Breakers
1990s architecture in New Zealand
Sports venues completed in 1992